Margaret Sumner ( Terrington; 7 July 1941 – 16 October 2022) was an international lawn bowls competitor for Australia.

Biography
Sumner was born on 7 July 1941. In 1996, she won the gold medal in the fours and silver medal in the triples at the 1996 World Outdoor Bowls Championship in Adelaide. Two years later she won a bronze medal at the 1998 Commonwealth Games in the pairs.

Sumner won four medals at the Asia Pacific Bowls Championships including double gold medal in the 1997 triples and fours at Warilla, Australia.

Sumner won the Terang Bowling Club Championship 18 times and married Allan Sumner in 1966.

Sumner died in Warrnambool on 16 October 2022, at the age of 81.

References

1941 births
2022 deaths
Australian female bowls players
Bowls World Champions
Commonwealth Games medallists in lawn bowls
Commonwealth Games bronze medallists for Australia
Bowls players at the 1998 Commonwealth Games
20th-century Australian women
Medallists at the 1998 Commonwealth Games